Trichromia neretina is a moth in the family Erebidae. It was described by Harrison Gray Dyar Jr. in 1898. It is found in Venezuela and Peru.

References

Arctiidae genus list at Butterflies and Moths of the World of the Natural History Museum

Moths described in 1898
neretina